Sevastijan Dabović (June 9, 1863 – November 30, 1940) was a Serbian-American monk and missionary who became the first Serbian Orthodox monk naturalized in North America. He is canonized as a Serbian Orthodox saint.

Life 

Sebastijan Dabović was born on 9 July 1863 in San Francisco, California, as the child of Serbian immigrants from the town of Risan in the Bay of Kotor. At his baptism, he was named Jovan. Later, he was ordained as a monk (Sebastijan) during his schooling in Russia and became a hierodeacon in 1887, and a hieromonk on August 16, 1892. In 1892, Sebastian was ordained as the first native-born Orthodox priest in the United States. He was soon sent to Minneapolis, Minnesota to replace Fr. Alexis Toth as the priest of St. Mary's Church there.

The first Serbian Orthodox parish in the United States was founded by Dabović in Jackson, California in 1892. Dabović soon initiated the construction of the first Serbian Orthodox church in the United States, the Saint Sava Serbian Orthodox Church in Jackson, which was consecrated in 1894. Dabović is also credited with founding several additional Serbian Orthodox churches in the United States.

Dabović was appointed as a missionary in California and Washington. It is believed that he baptized more people than any priest in the Western Hemisphere. Dabović's friend Nikolaj Velimirović called him the "greatest Serbian missionary of modern times". Some of the places where he did this include Seattle, Washington (the future St. Spiridon Cathedral), where he served as a temporary priest before Fr. Ambrose Vretta's arrival in November of 1895; Portland, Oregon; and Butte, Montana (the future Holy Trinity Church).

He was known as an apostle to émigré Serbs who settled in America. 

During the turn of the century, Sebastian corresponded with Rev. Francis J. Hall, D.D., of the Anglican confession on the subject of inter-relations between the two Communions. In 1902, he continued his missionary activities, returning to Alaska as dean of the Sitka deanery. While he was in Alaska, he helped establish Saint Sava Church in Douglas.

From 1904 to 1910, he led the Serbian Mission from its center at the Holy Resurrection Serbian Orthodox Church in Chicago, where he also served as the parish priest. In 1910, Sebastian asked for a release from the Serbian parish so that he could return to missionary work.  Then, a year or so later, he joined the faculty of the newly-opened St. Platon Seminary in Tenafly, New Jersey. Shortly thereafter he asked release so that he could serve as a chaplain in the Serbian army during World War I.

Dabović also had ties to Nikola Tesla, a Serbian American inventor who financially supported him.

Dabović died on November 30, 1940 at the Žiča Monastery in Kraljevo, which at the time was part of the Kingdom of Yugoslavia. He was buried at the monastery by Velimirović. Dabović's remains were transferred to Jackson in 2007.

The Serbian Orthodox Church canonized Dabović at the Holy Assembly in Belgrade on May 30, 2015.

Dabović was awarded Order of Saint Sava and Order of Prince Danilo I.

Writings
 The Lives of the Saints (1898)
 The Holy Orthodox Church (1898)
 Preaching in the Russian Church (1899)

References 

From Orthowiki: Sebastian (Dabovich) - OrthodoxWiki 

1863 births
1940 deaths
American missionaries
American monks
American saints of the Eastern Orthodox Church
People from Jackson, California
People from Kraljevo
People from San Francisco
Serbian monks
Serbian saints of the Eastern Orthodox Church